Dolly Madison is an American bakery brand owned by Hostess Brands, selling packaged baked snack foods. It is best known for its long marketing association with the Peanuts animated TV specials.

History

In 1937, Ralph Leroy Nafziger started a snack cake brand in Georgia called Dolly Madison. The name was inspired by first lady Dolley Madison known for elegant parties. The brand's slogan was "Cakes and pastries fine enough to serve at the White House." A Dolly Madison Bakery appears in the 1932 movie Officer 13 and was named after Dolley Madison, the wife of President James Madison, although with the first name spelled differently. The name was used for a successful ice cream brand sold for decades in the United States in the mid-twentieth century. The logo featured a silhouette of Dolly Madison. This brand was among the products that were liquidated by Hostess due to its announced plans to go out of business on November 16, 2012. Apollo Global Management, who acquired Hostess Brands' Twinkies in January 2013, also acquired the rights to the Dolly Madison snack cake brands, as well as the official corporate name to Dolly Madison and Hostess Brands, with plans to resume production of the products.

Marketing
Dolly Madison snacks are probably best known for their long association with characters from Charles M. Schulz's Peanuts comic strip. Charlie Brown and his friends appeared on Dolly Madison packages and in television commercials in the 1960s, 1970s and 1980s. The bakery, along with Coca-Cola and McDonald's, was a major sponsor of the Peanuts animated specials telecast on CBS during that period.  Each pie flavor was sold with a different character on the wrapper, including:
Charlie Brown – cherry and banana crème
Linus van Pelt – apple
Lucy van Pelt – lemon
Schroeder – berry
Sally Brown – coconut crème and pineapple
Frieda – chocolate
Peppermint Patty – strawberry and peach
Marcie – Boysenberry

The wrappers were later redesigned and featured Snoopy on all the flavors.  Charlie Brown was also on Zingers packages wearing a baseball cap. Snoopy was also on Gems donut packages as well.

During the period when the packages featured Peanuts characters, the advertising agency for Dolly Madison products was Dancer Fitzgerald Sample's San Francisco branch—primarily due to its proximity to Schulz (based in nearby Santa Rosa).

Products

See also

Snack cake
Zingers

References

Brand name snack foods
Hostess Brands brands
Companies that filed for Chapter 11 bankruptcy in 2004
Companies that filed for Chapter 11 bankruptcy in 2012